In enzymology, a monoprenyl isoflavone epoxidase is an enzyme that catalyzes the chemical reaction

7-O-methylluteone + NADPH + H+ + O2  dihydrofurano derivatives + NADP+ + H2O

The 4 substrates of this enzyme are 7-O-methylluteone, NADPH, H+, and O2, whereas its 3 products are dihydrofurano pyranoisoflavone derivative, NADP+, and H2O.

This enzyme belongs to the family of oxidoreductases, specifically those acting on paired donors, with O2 as oxidant and incorporation or reduction of oxygen. The oxygen incorporated need not be derive from O miscellaneous.  The systematic name of this enzyme class is 7-O-methylluteone,NADPH:O2 oxidoreductase. Other names in common use include monoprenyl isoflavone monooxygenase, and 7-O-methylluteone:O2 oxidoreductase.

References 

 

EC 1.14.99
NADPH-dependent enzymes
Enzymes of unknown structure
Isoflavones metabolism